Oudega is a small village in De Fryske Marren municipality in the province of Friesland, the Netherlands. It had a population of around 265 in 2017.

History
It was first mentioned in 1412 as Oldegae, and means "old village". The Dutch Reformed Church dates from 1850, and has been built on a terp (artificial living mound). In 1840, Oudega was home to 366 people.

Before 2014, Oudega was part of the Gaasterlân-Sleat municipality and before 1984 it belonged to Hemelumer Oldeferd which was named Hemelumer Oldephaert & Noordwolde (H.O.N.). before 1956.

Gallery

References

De Fryske Marren
Populated places in Friesland